Psammophis leithii, commonly called the Pakistan sand racer, Pakistani ribbon snake, or Leith's sand snake, is a species of rear-fanged snake in the family Psammophiidae. The species is native to South Asia. It is harmless to humans.

Etymology
The specific name, leithii, is in honor of Andrew H. Leith, a physician with the Bombay Sanitary Commission.

Geographic range
Psammophis leithii is found in eastern Afghanistan, western India (Uttar Pradesh, Jammu-Kashmir, Madhya Pradesh, Maharashtra, Rajasthan, Gujarat), and Pakistan.

Description
P. leithii has the rostral broader than deep, visible from above. The nostril is between two or three shields, the posterior nasal being frequently divided into two. The internasals are about half the length of the prefrontals. The frontal is very narrow, longer than its distance from the end of the snout, nearly as long as the parietals. The loreal is about twice as long as deep. There is a single preocular, in contact with the frontal; and two postoculars. The temporals are 1+2 or 2+2. There are 8 or 9 upper labials, the fourth and fifth (or fifth and sixth) entering the eye. There are 5 lower labials in contact with the anterior chin shields, which are a little shorter than the posterior chin shields. The dorsal scales are in 17 rows at midbody. The ventrals number 177–188. The anal is usually entire, and the subcaudals number 82–138.

P. leithii is pale greyish or yellowish above, with black dots or four longitudinal brown bands which are usually edged with black, the outer passing through the eyes. The lower parts are white, uniform or spotted or marked with grey or olive in the middle, with or without a dark lateral line or series of dots.

Venom
Like all species in the genus Psammophis, P. leithii possess a mild venom, which is delivered to prey by means of enlarged, grooved teeth at the rear of the snake's upper jaws. The venom is not usually harmful to humans.

References

Further reading
Boulenger GA (1896). Catalogue of the Snakes in the British Museum (Natural History). Volume III. Containing the Colubridæ (Opisthoglyphæ and Proteroglyphæ) ... London: Trustees of the British Museum (Natural History). (Taylor and Francis, printers). xiv + 727 pp. (Psammophis leithii, pp. 155–156).
 (2002). A Photographic Guide to Snakes and other Reptiles of India. Sanibel Island, Florida: Ralph Curtis Books. 144 pp. . (Psammophis leithii, p. 42).
Günther A (1869). "Report on two Collections of Indian Reptiles". Proc. Zool. Soc. London 1869: 500-507. (Psammophis leithii, new species, pp. 505–506 + Plate XXXIX).
Smith MA (1943). The Fauna of British India, Ceylon and Burma, Including the Whole of the Indo-Chinese Sub-region. Reptilia and Amphibia. Vol. III.—Serpentes. London: Secretary of State for India. (Taylor and Francis, printers). xii + 583 pp. ("Psammophis leithi [sic]", pp. 366–367, Figure 115).

Psammophis
Snakes of Asia
Reptiles of Afghanistan
Reptiles of India
Reptiles of Pakistan
Reptiles described in 1869
Taxa named by Albert Günther